Greasemarks: Greatest Hits 1976–79 is the first greatest hits album to be released by Australian band Ol' 55. The album includes tracks from the band's first three studio albums and was released in 1980.

Track listing

References

1980 greatest hits albums
Ol' 55 (band) albums
Mushroom Records compilation albums
Rock compilation albums
Compilation albums by Australian artists